Sir Robert Hamilton Bruce Lockhart, KCMG (2 September 1887 – 27 February 1970) was a British diplomat, journalist, author, secret agent and footballer. His 1932 book Memoirs of a British Agent became an international bestseller and brought him to the world's attention by telling of his failed effort to sabotage the Bolshevik Revolution in Moscow in 1918, by assassinating Lenin and instigating a coup.  After the plot failed, U.S. Consul General to Moscow and spymaster DeWitt Clinton Poole dissembled. It was said at the time that his main co-conspirator Sidney Reilly, and others were double agents working for the Bolsheviks. In the end, the "Lockhart Plot" was revealed as a cunning sting operation controlled by Felix Dzerzhinsky with the goal of discrediting the British and French governments.  However Boris Savinkov and in particular Xenophon Kalamatiano were working with State Department under the direction of U.S. Secretary of State Robert Lansing, as pieced together in recent research by the historian Barnes Carr.

Background
He was born in Anstruther, Fife, the son of Robert Bruce Lockhart, the first headmaster of Spier's School, Beith, Ayrshire, Scotland. His mother was Florence Stuart Macgregor, while his other ancestors include Bruces, Hamiltons, Cummings, Wallaces and Douglases. He claimed that he could trace a connection back to Boswell of Auchinleck. In Memoirs of a British Agent, he wrote, "There is no drop of English blood in my veins." He attended Fettes College, in Edinburgh.

His family were mostly schoolmasters, but his younger brother, Sir Robert McGregor MacDonald Lockhart, became an Indian Army general. On 15 August 1947, the day British India was partitioned into two independent Dominions of India and Pakistan, he was appointed as the last Commander-in-Chief of the Indian Army. His brother John Bruce Lockhart was the headmaster of Sedbergh School, and his nephews Rab Bruce Lockhart and Logie Bruce Lockhart went on to become headmasters of Loretto and Gresham's. His great-nephew, Simon Bruce-Lockhart, was the headmaster of Glenlyon Norfolk School.

Career

Malaya
At 21, Lockhart went out to Malaya to join two uncles who were rubber planters there. According to his own account, he was sent to open up a new rubber estate near Pantai in Negeri Sembilan, in a district in which "there were no other white men". He then "caused a minor sensation by carrying off Amai, the beautiful ward of the Dato' Klana, the local Malay prince... my first romance". However, three years in Malaya, and one with Amai, came to an end when "doctors pronounced Malaria, but there were many people who said that I had been poisoned". One of his uncles and one of his cousins "bundled my emaciated body into a motor car and... packed me off home via Japan and America". The Dato' Klana in question was the chief of Sungei Ujong, the most important of the Nine States of Negeri Sembilan, whose palace was at Ampangan.

First Moscow posting
Lockhart successfully passed the examination for the British Foreign Service and was posted to Moscow as Vice-Consul in January 1912. He was acting British Consul-General in Moscow for much of the First World War, from 1914 to 1917.  He was present when the February Revolution broke out in early 1917 but left shortly before the Bolshevik Revolution later that year. Lockhart states, "I left St. Petersburg just as the Kerensky-Korniloff duel was starting. I arrived in London six weeks before the Bolshevik revolution."

At the time of his arrival in Russia in 1912, people had heard that a great footballer named Lockhart from Cambridge was arriving, and he was invited to turn out for Morozov a textile factory team that played their games 30 miles east of Moscow. The manager of the cotton mill was from Lancashire, England. Lockhart played for most of the 1912 season, and his team won the Moscow league championship that year. The gold medal that he won is in the collection of the National Library of Scotland. The great player, however, was Bruce's brother, John, who had played rugby union for Scotland, and by his own admission, Bruce barely deserved his place in the team and played simply for the love of the sport.

Return to Moscow
In January 1918, at the behest of the British Prime Minister David Lloyd George and Lord Milner, the Secretary of State for War, Lockhart returned to Russia as the United Kingdom's first envoy to Bolshevik Russia, in an attempt to counteract German influence. (As Britain did not have diplomatic relations with the Bolsheviks, officially Lockhart was Head of a Special Mission.)  Lockhart also worked for the Secret Intelligence Service, having been given £648 worth of diamonds to fund the creation of an agent network in Russia.  Moura Budberg, the wife of a high-ranking Czarist diplomat, Count Johann von Benckendorff, became his mistress.  

When the wartime foreign correspondent Arthur Ransome was arrested in 1919 for spying for the Bolsheviks, Lockhart spoke out for him, saying Ransome had been a valuable intelligence asset amid the worst chaos of the revolution. Lockhart also helped Trotsky's secretary, Evgenia Petrovna Shelepina, with whom Ransome had fallen in love, to leave Russia in 1919; she married Ransome in 1924.

Arrest and imprisonment
In 1918, Lockhart and British agent Sidney Reilly were alleged to have plotted to assassinate Bolshevik leader Vladimir Lenin. Lockhart and British officials condemned that as Soviet propaganda.  He was accused of leading the "Lockhart Plot" against the Bolshevik regime and, for a time during 1918, was confined in the Kremlin as a prisoner and feared being condemned to death. However, he escaped trial via an exchange for his counterpart, Maksim Maksimovich Litvinov, the Bolshevik government's representative in London, who had been arrested for engaging in propaganda activities. 

Lockhart was tried in absentia before the Supreme Revolutionary Tribunal in a proceeding, which opened 25 November 1918. Some 20 defendants faced charges in the trial, most of whom had worked for the Americans or the British in Moscow, in the case levied by procurator Nikolai Krylenko. The case concluded on 3 December 1918, with two defendants sentenced to be shot and various others sentenced to terms of prison or forced labour for terms up to five years. Lockhart and Reilly were both sentenced to death in absentia, with the sentence to be executed if they were ever found in Soviet Russia again.

Lockhart wrote about his experiences in Malaya and Russia in his 1932 autobiography, Memoirs of a British Agent, which became a best seller, and whose chapters on the Revolution were turned into the 1934 film, British Agent, by Warner Brothers.

Finance 
In November 1919, Lockhart was appointed commercial secretary of the British legation in Prague. In late 1922, with the personal debts he ran up exceeding his official salary and feeling the need for change, he resigned from the Foreign Service to accept a position in Prague with the Anglo-Czechoslovakian Bank, on whose creation he had worked. In 1925, Lockhart moved to a job with the Anglo-International Bank, based in London but specializing in central European affairs. By 1928, however, again indebted and bored, he sought a new career in journalism. Lockhart turned his experiences in central Europe during these years into his second volume of autobiography, Retreat from Glory (1934).

Journalism 
After leaving the world of finance, Lockhart joined Lord Beaverbook's Evening Standard. He served as the editor of the paper's Londoner's Diary column and became known for his hard-drinking and semi-debauched lifestyle. It enhanced his reputation that, despite having been caught by the Russians and exchanged for a Soviet agent, he remained on unusually cordial terms with the Soviet Embassy in London, from whom he received an annual gift of caviar. He also helped to organise Beaverbrook's Empire Free Trade Crusade campaign. In the 1930s, Lockhart began to release a number of books, which were successful enough to allow him to take up writing as a full-time career in 1937.

Later life
During the Second World War, Lockhart returned to government service. He became director-general of the Political Warfare Executive, co-ordinating all British propaganda against the Axis powers. He was also for a time the British liaison officer to the Czechoslovak government-in-exile under President Edvard Beneš. Lockhart recounted his activities from the Munich Crisis to VJ-Day in another volume of autobiography, Comes the Reckoning (1947).  After the war, he resumed writing, lecturing and broadcasting and made a weekly BBC Radio broadcast to Czechoslovakia for over ten years.

Personal life
In 1913, Lockhart married firstly Jean Adelaide Haslewood Turner of Brisbane, Australia, and they had a son, the author Robin Bruce Lockhart, who wrote the book Ace of Spies (1967) – about his father's friend, the agent Sidney Reilly – from which the television serial Reilly, Ace of Spies (1983) was later produced.

He divorced his first wife Jean in 1938 citing her adultery with Loudon McNeill McClean.

In 1948, Lockhart married his second wife Frances Mary Beck.

His diaries, published after his death, reveal that he struggled for most of his life with alcoholism.

Death and legacy
Lockhart died on 27 February 1970, at the age of 82, and left property valued at £2054. His address at death was Brookside, Ditchling, Sussex.

The 1983 British television series Reilly, Ace of Spies, was based on a book by his son. Lockhart was portrayed by actor Ian Charleson in the series.

Honours
 Knight Commander of the Order of St Michael and St George (1943).

Books
 Memoirs of a British Agent (Putnam, London, 1932).  American edition: British Agent (Putnam, New York, 1933)
 Retreat from Glory (Putnam, London, 1934)
 Return to Malaya (Putnam, London, 1936)
 My Scottish Youth (Putnam, London, 1937)
 Guns or Butter: War countries and peace countries of Europe revisited (Putnam, London, 1938)
 A Son of Scotland (Putnam, London, 1938)
 Comes the Reckoning (Putnam, London, 1947)
 My Rod, My Comfort (Putnam, London, 1949)
 The Marines Were There: the Story of the Royal Marines in the Second World War (Putnam, London, 1950)
 Scotch: the Whisky of Scotland in Fact and Story (Putnam, London, 1951)
 My Europe (Putnam, London, 1952)
 What Happened to the Czechs? (Batchworth Press, London, 1953)
 Your England (Putnam, London, 1955)
 Jan Masaryk, a Personal Memoir (Putnam, London, 1956)
 Friends, Foes, and Foreigners (Putnam, London, 1957)
 The Two Revolutions: an Eyewitness Study of Russia, 1917 (Bodley Head, London, 1967)
 The Diaries of Sir Robert Bruce Lockhart Vol 1 (Macmillan, London, 1973)
 The Diaries of Sir Robert Bruce Lockhart Vol 2 (Macmillan, London, 1980)
 My Scottish Youth (B&W Publishing, Edinburgh 1993)

See also
 List of Scottish cricket and rugby union players
 Logie Bruce Lockhart (son of R. H. Bruce Lockhart's brother, J. H. Bruce Lockhart)
 Sandy Bruce-Lockhart, Baron Bruce-Lockhart (grandson of R. H. Bruce Lockhart's brother, J. H. Bruce Lockhart)
 Dugald Bruce Lockhart (great-great-nephew)

References

External links
 
 BRITISH AGENT by R. H. Bruce Lockhart
Parliamentary Archives, Papers of Robert Bruce Lockhart

1887 births
1970 deaths
Robert Hamilton 
Knights Commander of the Order of St Michael and St George
People from Anstruther
20th-century Scottish writers
Writers about the Soviet Union
Scottish diplomats
Scottish politicians
British propagandists
People educated at Fettes College
Foreign Office personnel of World War II
World War I spies for the United Kingdom